The  is a women's world professional wrestling championship owned by the World Wonder Ring Stardom promotion. The title, which is situated at the top of Stardom's championship hierarchy, was introduced on June 26, 2011, and the inaugural champion was crowned on July 24, 2011, when Nanae Takahashi defeated Yoko Bito in the finals of a four-woman tournament.

History 

On July 24, 2011, Nanae Takahashi defeated Yoko Bito in the finals of a four-woman tournament to become the inaugural champion. On February 22, 2015, during a title match between the current champion Yoshiko and Act Yasukawa, the two began shooting on each other with Yoshiko getting the advantage, legitimately injuring Yasukawa, as the match had to be ended prematurely. Yasukawa was diagnosed with fractured cheek, nasal and orbital bones, which would require surgery. Three days later, Yoshiko was stripped of the title. On March 29, Kairi Hojo defeated Io Shirai in the finals of a four-woman tournament to win the vacant championship.

On September 24, 2017, during a match between the current champion Mayu Iwatani against Toni Storm, the title changed hands which was unplanned, as Iwatani legitimately dislocated her elbow, prompting the referee to stop the match and award the championship to Storm.

Origin and belt design 
The title is often referred to simply as the "Red Belt", a name famously used by All Japan Women's Pro-Wrestling (AJW) to refer to its WWWA World Single Championship (of which Takahashi had been the last titleholder back in 2006). The title belt was crafted by American company Top Rope Belts, with a conscious decision to imitate the AJW title belt in terms of its color, with Stardom president Rossy Ogawa referring to the promotion's heyday as the "Golden Age of Joshi Puroresu". The title has also been defended in Mexico and France.

Reigns 
Nanae Takahashi was the inaugural champion, as well as the longest reign at 602 days. Alpha Female has the shortest reign at 43 days. Io Shirai and Mayu Iwatani has the most reigns at two. Meiko Satomura is the oldest champion at 35 years old, while Yoshiko is the youngest at 21 years old.

Giulia is the current champion in her first reign. She defeated Syuri on December 29, 2022 at Dream Queendom 2.

Combined reigns 

Footnotes

See also 
 Wonder of Stardom Championship
 World Women's Championship (disambiguation)

References

External links 
 World Wonder Ring Stardom's official website
 World of Stardom Championship history at Wrestling-Titles.com

World Wonder Ring Stardom championships
Women's professional wrestling championships